Xeración Nós was a Galician nationalist intellectual group of the 1920s, which followed from the cultural Rexurdimento movement of the 19th century. The name alludes to the Irish Sinn Féin ("We Ourselves"). The group's tradition was revived by the Xeración Galaxia in the 1950s.

Gallery

See also

:gl:Cenáculo ourensán
:gl:Literatura galega do século XX

References

Galician literature